Here follows a list of renamings of universities and colleges in the United States.

A

B

C

D

E

F

G

H

I

J

K

L

M

N

O

P

R

S

T

U-V

W–Z

See also
 List of American institutions of higher education
 List of colloquial names for universities and colleges in the United States
 List of university and college mergers in the United States
 List of university and college nickname changes in the United States

References

Name changes